The Libera Award for Label of the Year categories are presented by the American Association of Independent Music at the annual Libera Award which recognizes "best independent record label worldwide" since 2012. The category is divided into three other categories, based on the number of full-time employees. Independent record labels with more than fifteen full-time employees are categorized into the Label of the Year (Large). Label of the Year (Medium) categorizes independent record labels with six to fourteen full-time employees. Record labels with five full-time employees or fewer are categorized into the Label of the Year (Small) category.

From 2012 to 2018, independent record labels with six or more full-time employees were categorized into the same category, Label of the Year (Large).

Label of the Year (Large)

Label of the Year (Medium)

Label of the Year (Small)

References

External links

Label of the Year